John Gaspar Ferdinand de Marchin, or Marsin, Comte de Granville (1601–1673) was a Walloon military commander from the Spanish Netherlands.

Life
At the age of thirteen Marchin was enlisted in the regiment of the Count of Tilly and fought many battles in the Thirty Years War. He later served under Louis II de Bourbon, Prince de Condé.

By 1647, he was lieutenant general and in command of the Army in Catalonia. During the Fronde he sided with the Great Condé against King Louis XIV. He was imprisoned in Perpignan for 13 months. When the peace was signed on 30 July 1653, Marchin, like Condé, refused the amnesty and went to Spain where Philip IV appointed him company commander in his army.

In 1658 Charles II of England made him a Knight of the Garter.

He participated in the disastrous campaign in the Portuguese Restoration War under John of Austria (1663–1664). He also led the Spanish troops against the French in the north of France, where he was defeated in 1667 by François de Créquy. 
 
Marchin then retired to his estate at Modave Castle, where he spent his entire fortune on its restoration, which took 15 years.

Family
Marchin married Marie de Balzac d'Entragues, daughter of the Marquis de Clermont, counsellor to the King of France.

They had two children : 
 Ferdinand de Marsin (1651–1706), Marshal of France, killed in the Battle of Turin.
 Agnes de Marsin, died young.

Sources 
 Modave Castle official website
 Eupedia: Modave Castle

1601 births
1673 deaths
e
South Netherlandish people of the Thirty Years' War
Prince-Bishopric of Liège military personnel
Knights of the Garter
Military personnel of the Thirty Years' War
Military personnel of the Franco-Spanish War (1635–1659)